The Tucson Roadrunners  are a professional ice hockey team in the American Hockey League (AHL) that began play for the 2016–17 season. Based in Tucson, Arizona, and affiliated with the National Hockey League's Arizona Coyotes, the team plays its home games at the Tucson Convention Center Arena.

History
On April 19, 2016, the Arizona Coyotes announced that they had reached an agreement to purchase their AHL affiliate, the Springfield Falcons, and would relocate the team to Tucson for the 2016–17 season.  Said purchase and relocation was contingent on three approvals; the first from Rio Nuevo (Tucson's downtown revitalization authority) to invest $3.2 million in arena upgrades to bring the Convention Center to professional-quality standards was approved on April 26,  the second from the AHL Board of Governors to conditionally approve the purchase and relocation by the Coyotes was approved on May 10, and the third from the Tucson City Council for a 10-year lease with the Convention Center was approved on May 17.

A name-the-team contest was held between May 17 and May 31. The hockey club's new name and logo were revealed on June 18 during the Tucson Convention Center's open house event. The chosen name, Roadrunners, pays homage to the Phoenix Roadrunners, a team name that was used for various Phoenix professional hockey teams from 1967 to 2009, and creates a play on words with its parent club the Coyotes (a reference to the classic cartoon duo of Wile E. Coyote and the Road Runner).  Its logo, as well, is a close match for the traditional logo used for Phoenix Roadrunners' teams of the past. On October 27, the day before their home opener, the Roadrunners unveiled their mascot, Dusty the Roadrunner. Dusty wears number 16 on his jersey, representing the year the Springfield Falcons relocated to Tucson in 2016.

On June 21, 2016, Mark Lamb was hired as the team's first head coach after holding the same position with the Western Hockey League's Swift Current Broncos since 2009. Mark Hardy was hired as an assistant coach. The team named its first president Brian Sandy, along with three other key staff members, on July 18. On July 20, the Roadrunners announced their first general manager, Doug Soetaert, promoted from his former position as a scout for the Coyotes.

The Roadrunners played their first-ever game on October 14, 2016, against the San Diego Gulls at Pechanga Arena, losing 5–3. Roadrunners' inaugural captain Craig Cunningham scored the team's first two goals in franchise history. The Roadrunners played their first home game two weeks later on October 28, winning by a score of 6–5 in front of 6,521 fans.

During a home game against the Manitoba Moose on November 19, 2016, Roadrunners player Craig Cunningham collapsed on the ice just before the opening faceoff. He was promptly transported to the hospital, where he was diagnosed with an acute cardiac arrest resulting from ventricular fibrillation, a condition that caused his heart to stop beating. The arena's medical team, in addition to the staff at St. Mary's Hospital and Banner-University Medical Center, worked continuously for 85 minutes to administer CPR and ultimately succeeded in saving his life. On October 27, 2017, the Roadrunners retired Cunningham's No. 14 jersey during a pregame ceremony.

After one season, Lamb was released and replaced by Mike Van Ryn, the player development coach with the Coyotes. Under Van Ryn, the Roadrunners finished in first place in the Pacific Division but were eliminated by the Texas Stars in the division finals of the 2018 Calder Cup playoffs. Van Ryn then left to pursue other coaching opportunities and was hired by the St. Louis Blues. The Coyotes then hired Jay Varady as head coach of the Roadrunners for the 2018–19 season after a successful season as coach of the Kingston Frontenacs.

On May 12, 2020, the AHL announced the cancelation for the remainder of the 2019–20 season due to the COVID-19 pandemic. The Roadrunners were awarded the Pacific division championship for having the best record in the division when play was suspended and later canceled. Prior to the postponed start of the 2020–21 season, head coach Varady joined the Coyotes' staff as an assistant coach and assistant Steve Potvin was promoted to head coach of the Roadrunners. Varady returned to the Roadrunners as head coach before the 2021–22 season. Following the season, Varady departed for the Detroit Red Wings as an assistant coach, with Potvin being renamed as head coach for the 2022–23 season.

Rivalries
The Roadrunners consider the San Diego Gulls, the AHL affiliate of the Anaheim Ducks, as their primary rival and refer to them as their "I-8 Border Rival". Additionally, the winner of each season's series between the two teams is presented with the "I-8 Border Cup Trophy", which has been in the possession of the Roadrunners since the 2018–19 season. As of the conclusion of the 2021–22 season, the two teams have faced each other 56 times during the regular season, which is the highest number of games that the Roadrunners have played against any opponent. As of their most recent matchup on March 4, 2023, the Roadrunners current record against the Gulls is 30–30–2–1, with the Roadrunners currently leading the 2022–23 season series 3–2–2–0.

Season-by-season results

Players

Current roster
Updated March 18, 2023.

|}

Team captains

 Craig Cunningham, 2016
 Andrew Campbell, 2017–18
 Dakota Mermis, 2018–19
 Michael Chaput, 2019–20
 Dysin Mayo, 2021
 Hudson Fasching, 2022
 Adam Cracknell, 2022–present

Retired numbers

Team records and leaders
Figures are accurate as of March 18, 2023.

Scoring leaders
These are the top-ten point-scorers for the Tucson Roadrunners in the AHL.

Note: Pos = Position; GP = Games played; G = Goals; A = Assists; Pts = Points; P/G = Points per game;  = current  Roadrunners player

Franchise leaders

Single season

Career

References

External links
 

 
2016 establishments in Arizona
1
Ice hockey clubs established in 2016
Ice hockey teams in Arizona
Sports in Tucson, Arizona